Inderjeet Parmar is a professor of international politics, and head of the Department of International Politics at City, University of London and an Honorary Research Fellow (Politics) at the University of Manchester. He is past president of British International Studies Association and Vice Chairman of the British International Studies Association, where he formerly served as Treasurer. He has been described as "an obligatory reference point on the history of social science, international relations and US foreign policy."

His current book project is entitled Presidents and Prime Ministers at War: Race, elitism and empire in Anglo-American wars from Korea to the wars on terror.

Parmar is a member of the steering committee of The Trump Project at UC, Dublin.

Parmar is a regular commentator on American politics and foreign policy on CNN, BBC, RT, TRT, and TalkRadio. He is a columnist at The Wire.

Reception 
When Foundations of the American Century was published in 2012, it was reviewed by Walter Russell Mead for the foreign policy journal Foreign Affairs, the flagship publication of the Council on Foreign Relations. Although Mead points out a few of his reservations, the review is generally positive.

Publications 

Books
 Think Tanks and Power in Foreign Policy: A Comparative Study of the Role and Influence of the Council on Foreign Relations and the Royal Institute of International Affairs, 1939-1945. Palgrave Macmillan (2004). . .
 New Directions in U.S. Foreign Policy. Routledge Studies in U.S. Foreign Policy (2009). .
 Soft Power and U.S. Foreign Policy Theoretical, Historical and Contemporary Perspectives. Routledge Studies in U.S. Foreign Policy (2010).
 Barack Obama and the Myth of a Post-Racial America, edited with Mark Ledwidge. Routledge Series on Identity Politics (2013)
 Foundations of the American Century: The Ford, Carnegie, and Rockefeller Foundations in the Rise of American Power. Columbia University Press (2015).

Book contributions
 "How Elite Networks Shape the Contours of the Discipline and What We Might Do About It" (Chapter 8). In: What's the Point of International Relations? New York: Routledge (2017). .

Articles
 "American Power and Identities in the Age of Obama." International Politics, vol. 48, no. 2 (March 2011). .
 "Not So Cuddly." Berfrois (April 4, 2012). Archived from the original.
 "The Legitimacy Crisis of the U.S. Elite and the Rise of Donald Trump." Insight Turkey, vol. 19, no. 3 (2017), pp. 9–22. .
 "Black Lives Matter must avoid being co-opted by American corporate philanthropy." PMP Magazine (July 20, 2020). Archived from the original.

References

External links
 Articles at Academia.edu
 Publications at ResearchGate
 Biography at the Wilson Center
 Biography + bibliography at City, University of London

Academics of City, University of London
Living people
Academics of the University of Manchester
Year of birth missing (living people)